Scrobipalpa nonyma is a moth in the family Gelechiidae. It was described by Turner in 1919. It is found in Australia, where it has been recorded from Victoria.

The forewings are whitish-brown with a few fuscous scales towards the apex. The stigmata are fuscous, the first discal before the middle, the second discal beyond the middle, the plical beneath the first discal. The hindwings are whitish.

References

Scrobipalpa
Moths described in 1919